Lee Jae-won (born 4 March 1983) is a South Korean footballer who plays as defender for Bucheon FC 1995 in K League 2.

Career
Lee joined Ulsan Hyundai before the 2006 season starts.

He signed with Pohang Steelers in March 2015.

After 2016 season, he moved to Bucheon FC 1995. Therefore he is appointed as a subcaptain in 2017 season.

References

External links 

1983 births
Living people
Association football defenders
South Korean footballers
South Korean expatriate footballers
Ulsan Hyundai FC players
Qingdao Hainiu F.C. (1990) players
Ulsan Hyundai Mipo Dockyard FC players
Goyang KB Kookmin Bank FC players
Pohang Steelers players
Bucheon FC 1995 players
K League 1 players
Chinese Super League players
Korea National League players
South Korean expatriate sportspeople in China
Expatriate footballers in China